Kjell Georg Lund (born 23 January 1944) is a Norwegian race walker. He was born in Bergen, Norway.

He competed at the 1972 Summer Olympics in Munich, where he placed 24th in the men's 50 kilometres walk.

References

External links

1944 births
Living people
Sportspeople from Bergen
Norwegian male racewalkers
Athletes (track and field) at the 1972 Summer Olympics
Olympic athletes of Norway
20th-century Norwegian people